The National Assembly was the authoritative legislative body of the Republic of China, commonly referred to as Taiwan after 1949, from 1947 to 2005. Along with the Control Yuan (upper house) and the Legislative Yuan (lower house), the National Assembly formed the tricameral parliament of China. If still functional, at 3,045 members, the National Assembly would have been the largest parliamentary chamber in the world.

Similar to other electoral colleges, the National Assembly had elected the President and Vice President under the 1947 Constitution of the Republic of China with the role of the constituent assembly that aimed to amend the country's constitution.

The first National Assembly was elected in November 1947 and met in Nanking in March 1948. However, in the next year, the Kuomintang-led government of the Republic of China lost mainland China in the Chinese Civil War and retreated to Taiwan. The National Assembly resumed its meeting in Taipei in 1954. In the 1990s, its parliamentary powers were gradually transferred to the Legislative Yuan and direct democracy exercised by the Taiwanese people before constitutional amendments made it a dormant body in 2000 and de facto dissolved in 2005.

History

Early Republican period

Calls for a National Assembly were part of the platform of the revolutionaries who ultimately overthrew the Qing dynasty. In response, the Qing dynasty formed the first assembly in 1910, but it was virtually powerless and intended only as an advisory body. In the early Republican Era, the bicameral National Assembly was established by the Beiyang government. The design referred to the structure of the United States Congress as Senate and House of Representatives. However, the Warlord Era with the interference of military power toward the constitution suppressed the authority and the reputation of the National Assembly.

The Chinese social and political science review quoted the institution's English name as National People's Congress during  the drafting of constitution.

1947 Constitution

In 1946, the Constituent Assembly promulgated a new constitution and the first National Assembly met in 1948 in Nanjing, the Chinese capital. Apart from the KMT, the only legal parties were the Democratic Socialist Party and the Youth Party.

Under the constitution, the main duty of the National Assembly was to elect the President and Vice President for terms of six years. It also had the right to recall or impeach the President and Vice President if they failed to fulfill their political responsibilities. According to "National Assembly Duties Act," the National Assembly could amend the constitution with a two-thirds majority, with at least three-quarters membership present, as well as to ratify constitutional amendedments proposed by deputies of the Legislative Yuan. It could also change territorial boundaries. The responsibilities of the deputies of the Assembly, as well as of the Assembly as a whole, were derived from the directions of Sun Yat-sen. At that time the NA served as a counterpart to the Supreme Soviet of the Soviet Union, with a Presidum of the National Assembly governing over its activities.

Shortly afterwards in 1949, mainland China fell to the communists in the Chinese Civil War, and the National Assembly (along with the entire ROC government) was relocated to Taipei. The Assembly's right to legislate was put into moratorium until at least half of all counties in the nation were again able to elect representatives via their County Assemblies.

The first National Assembly was to serve for a period of only six years. However, according to the Kuomintang (KMT) leadership, the fall of the Mainland made it impossible to hold new elections there, as all Mainland provinces were under communist rebellion. As a result, the Judicial Yuan decided that the original members of the National Assembly representing communist-controlled constituencies must continue to hold office until new elections could be held. National Assembly elections were still held in territories under ROC control.

In accordance with the 76th interpretation of the 1947 Constitution by the Judicial Yuan in 1957, the NA formed part of a three-chamber tricameral parliament together with the Legislative and Control Yuans and was the seniormost chamber of parliament, with the latter two performing regular legislative work in the absence of the Assembly. During the years when it elected or recalled the president and vice president, it acted as an electoral college with all its county representatives serving as electors.

Constitutional reforms in the 1990s

As a result of this decision, the same National Assembly, elected in 1947, remained for 44 years until 1991, when as part of a constitutional ruling a Second National Assembly was elected. There was strong objection to the Assembly, which was derisively called the "" by critics.

Shortly after passing constitutional reforms in 1991, the National Assembly held direct elections in December. Following a 1994 constitutional amendment, the Assembly essentially became a permanent constituent assembly, as the Assembly's other major role, to elect the President and Vice President of the Republic of China, was abolished. Direct elections for the president, vice president, and Assembly were held simultaneously in March 1996. However, these reforms granted it new functions, such as hearing the president's State of the Nation Address and approving the president's nominations of the grand justices and the heads of the Examination and Control Yuans. Following the assembly's abolition, these functions are now in the hands of the Legislative Yuan.

In 1999, the Assembly passed constitutional amendments which would link its election and term with the Legislative Yuan. Part of these amendments' effect was to extend the term of both bodies, which was strongly criticized by the public. The People First Party was founded shortly after the 2000 presidential election. The two larger parties, the Kuomintang and Democratic Progressive Party, wished to bar the People First Party (PFP) from the National Assembly. As a result, the 2000 National Assembly elections were canceled, and delegates were to be selected ad hoc on the basis of proportional representation via special election within six months of the Legislative Yuan proposing constitutional amendments, calling for the impeachment of the president or vice president, or declaring a vote on changes to national borders. However, no such situation arose from 2000 to 2004, and the National Assembly never met during this period.

Dissolution
On 23 August 2004, the Legislative Yuan proposed a series of amendments that included dissolution of the National Assembly.  The purpose of this proposal is to transfer power to ratify constitutional amendments and territorial amendments from the National Assembly to the people.  Under the amendments, subsequent proposed amendments are to be approved by three-fourths of the present members in the Legislative Yuan, with at least three-fourths of all members present.  It would then be promulgated for a period of 180 days and then submitted to a referendum, in which a simple majority of all eligible voters shall be sufficient to ratify the amendments.  A Democratic Progressive Party proposal authorizing citizens' initiative rights to propose constitutional amendments was withdrawn after it became clear that such a proposal would not pass the Legislative Yuan. Opponents of such constitutional reforms argued that by eliminating the 3/4 legislative vote requirement, a relatively small number of voters could force a referendum on Taiwan independence which would trigger a crisis with the People's Republic of China. By contrast, keeping the 3/4 legislative vote requirement would mean that any constitutional amendment would require a consensus among both the pan-green coalition and pan-blue coalition to be considered. The requirement that a majority of all voters approve the amendment allows for a party to block an amendment by boycotting the vote as was done with the referendums voted on alongside the March 2004 presidential elections.

Under the Constitution at the time, the National Assembly must then be elected to consider these amendments. Such consideration and eventual ratification of the constitutional amendments was originally considered to be a formality, but a number of unexpected complications occurred in 2005. The first was the poor showing of the People First Party (PFP) in the 2004 Legislative Yuan election. The PFP was widely expected to merge with the KMT, but PFP Chairman James Soong became disenchanted by the idea. The second was the reluctance of the Taiwan Solidarity Union to pass the amendments. These amendments were seen by some Taiwan independence supporters as a prelude to a later declaration of independence, but the results of the 2004 election made this very unlikely. Faced with this outcome, the TSU became very reluctant to support a reform that would make elections by small parties such as itself harder.

Another unexpected event occurred which gave the National Assembly elections on 14 May 2005 more significance than had been intended: the election was lined up immediately after trips to mainland China by KMT Chairman Lien Chan and PFP Chairman James Soong.  This had the effect of turning the May 14 elections into an opinion poll on relations with mainland China which was undesired by the Democratic Progressive Party, though the DPP subsequently gained a plurality in the elections.

On 7 June 2005, the 300 delegates voted (by a majority of 249 to 48) the constitutional amendments into effect, and so dissolved the National Assembly until the "unification of the country" as stated in the preamble.

Functions
The National Assembly held the most important constitutional powers within the national organs under the 1947 constitution. All of its powers were transferred to the Legislative Yuan and direct democracy exercised by the citizens of the free area after a series of constitutional amendments as Additional Articles of the Constitution in the 1990s and early 2000s.

 Procedure for ratification of national territory alteration was changed to be proposed by Legislative Yuan and ratified by National Assembly elected after the proposal has been made in the 2000 amendment (6th), and then the final ratification power was transferred to the citizens of the free area in the 2005 amendment (7th).
 Power to elect President and the Vice President was transferred to the citizens of the free area in the 1992 amendment (2nd), and then further clarified to be in form of "direct election" in the 1994 amendment (3rd). See Presidential elections in Taiwan.
 Procedure to recall the President and the Vice President was changed to be proposed by the National Assembly and voted by the citizens of the free area in the 1994 amendment (3rd), and changed to be proposed by the Legislative Yuan and voted by the citizens of the free area in the 2000 amendment (6th).
 Procedure for ratification of constitutional amendment was changed to be proposed by Legislative Yuan and ratified by National Assembly elected after the proposal has been made in the 2000 amendment (6th), and then the final ratification power was transferred to the citizens of the free area in the 2005 amendment (7th).
 Procedure to impeach the President and the Vice President was changed to be proposed by the Legislative Yuan and voted by the National Assembly in the 1997 amendment (4th), and the final decision power was moved to be judged by the Justices of the Judicial Yuan in Constitutional Court in the 2005 amendment (7th).

The series of constitutional amendments coined the Additional Articles of the Constitution as the current fundamental law of Taiwan. During the evolution of the Additional Articles, the National Assembly also held the power to confirm some important governmental officers to maintain the separation of powers during the government reorganization.

Elections and terms

The Kuomintang-led government of the Republic of China retreated to Taiwan in 1949, two years after the first election was held in China. As Kuomintang insists to claim the sovereignty over the whole China, the term of the members were extended until "re-election is possible in their original electoral district." In response to the increasing democracy movement in Taiwan, limited supplementary elections were held in Taiwan starting from 1969 and parts of Fujian from 1972. Members elected in these supplementary elections served together with the members who were elected in 1948. This situation remained until a Constitutional Court (Judicial Yuan) ruling on June 21, 1991 that ordered the retirement of all members with extended terms by the end of year 1991.

Timeline of National Assembly elections and terms

National Assembly sessions

 Functions of the National Assembly are now exercised by the constitutional referendums by Taiwanese people, Legislative Yuan and Constitutional Court of Judicial Yuan.

Leaders of the National Assembly

Secretary-general
When the Assembly is not in session, the secretary-general is the de facto highest-ranking official, in charge of the overall affairs of the Assembly and supervising its staff. Note that the secretary-general is entitled acting secretary-general when the National Assembly is not in session.

Presidium and Speaker 

 The 1st and 2nd National Assemblies elected a presidium as the leader of the body.
 The 3rd National Assembly elected a speaker and a deputy speaker to lead the assembly.
 The 2005 ad hoc National Assembly reverted to electing a presidium as the leader of the body.

The 2005 ad hoc National Assembly elected a presidium with 11 members as follows:

See also

 Nanjing Great Hall of the People
 Zhongshan Hall
 Chung-Shan Building
 United States Electoral College
 Supreme Soviet of the Soviet Union
 National People's Congress
 Legislative Yuan

Notes

References

External links 

 National Assembly meeting records

Government of Taiwan
Historical legislatures in China
Defunct organizations based in Taiwan
1947 establishments in China
1947 establishments in Taiwan
1949 disestablishments in China
2005 disestablishments in Taiwan